Peach Orchard is an unincorporated community and coal town in Lawrence County, Kentucky, United States. Their post office  no longer exists. It was also known as Mellensburg.

References

Unincorporated communities in Lawrence County, Kentucky
Unincorporated communities in Kentucky
Coal towns in Kentucky